The Ancona is a breed of chicken which originated in the Marches, region of Italy, but which was bred to its present type mainly in the United Kingdom in the nineteenth century. It is named after the city of Ancona, capital of the Marche. It is popular in Britain and the United States, but uncommon in Italy; an initiative to re-establish it in its native area and preserve its biodiversity was launched in 2000. There are also Ancona bantams.

History 

The Ancona originated in central Italy, where it was the most widely distributed breed of chicken. The first Ancona chickens were imported into England in 1851, and selectively bred there for regularity and consistency of the white markings in the plumage. In 1880 a breeder named Cobb showed a group. Some birds were exported from Britain to the United States in 1888. Rose-combed Ancona chickens were first shown in Birmingham in 1910.

In the United States, the single-comb Ancona was recognised by the American Poultry Association in 1898, and the rose-comb bird in 1914.

Characteristics 

The Ancona is a typical Mediterranean breed, rustic, lively and hardy. Birds range widely and take flight easily.

The plumage is black, mottled with white. Approximately one feather in three has a v-shaped white marking at the tip. All primaries, sickles and tail-feathers should have white tips. The black feathers may have a beetle-green tint. In Italy, blue mottled with white is also recognised in full-size birds, but not in bantams. Australia recognises a Red variety, with a chestnut to red bay ground colour.

The legs are yellow mottled with black, the beak yellow with some black markings on the upper mandible, and the eye orange-red. The skin is yellow, the ear-lobes white or cream-coloured. The comb is of medium size, with five well-marked points; in hens it should fall gracefully to one side. In the United Kingdom and in the United States, but not in Italy, a rose comb is permitted.

Use 

The Ancona is a good layer of white eggs, of which it lays an average of 220 per year; the eggs weigh  or more. Hens have little tendency to broodiness; pullets may begin to lay at 5 months.

References 

Conservation Priority Breeds of the Livestock Conservancy
Chicken breeds originating in Italy
Chicken breeds
Animal breeds on the RBST Watchlist